Charles Hughes (February 27, 1822 – August 10, 1887) was an American lawyer and politician from New York. He served one term in the  U.S. House of Representatives from 1853 to 1855.

Biography 
Hughes was born in New Orleans, Louisiana. He studied law, was admitted to the bar, and commenced practice in Sandy Hill.

Congress 
He was elected as a Democrat to the 33rd United States Congress, holding office from March 4, 1853, to March 3, 1855.

Later career 
Hughes was Clerk of the New York Court of Appeals from 1860 to 1862, elected at the 1859 New York state election, on the Republican and American tickets, but defeated for re-election at the 1862 New York state election on the Union ticket.

He also served as provost marshal for the sixteenth district of New York, was a member of the Governor’s staff and Judge Advocate General of the New York State Militia. He was a member of the New York State Senate (12th D.) in 1878 and 1879.

Death 
He died in Sandy Hill, Washington County, New York, and was buried at the Union Cemetery, between Fort Edward and Sandy Hill.

References

1822 births
1887 deaths
New York (state) state senators
Politicians from New Orleans
People from Hudson Falls, New York
Clerks of the New York Court of Appeals
New York (state) Republicans
New York (state) Know Nothings
New York (state) Unionists
Democratic Party members of the United States House of Representatives from New York (state)
19th-century American politicians
Members of the United States House of Representatives from New York (state)